Athylia fisheri is a species of beetle in the family Cerambycidae. It was described by Gilmour in 1948.

References

Athylia
Beetles described in 1948